Albert Likeke Mongita, also known as Mongita Likeke (1916—1985) was an actor, dramatist, painter, filmmaker and theatre director from the Democratic Republic of Congo. Mongita was "one of the leaders of the national theatre movement in the decades after World War II".

Life
Albert Mongita was born on 8 March 1916 at Irebu in Belgian Congo. When he was one year old, he came to Léopoldville (now Kinshasa). After six years in primary school and two years in a professional school, he attended the middle school St. Joseph's Institute for five years. Staying on to teach for five more years, he left to work for the post administration. In 1949 he joined Radio Congo Belge as an editor and announcer.

After writing several sketches, he became interested in theatre. Mongita joined the Alumni Association of the Fathers of Scheuts (ADAPES) in Léopoldville in the early 1950s, later becoming its theatrical driving force. With André Scohy, Mongita organized several national popular theatre festivals, and tours to Léopoldville by foreign theatre groups. Mongito write several plays in French for his theatre group, La ligue folklorique congolaise. Soko Stanley te was performed in Léopoldville in 1954, on the fiftieth anniversary of Henry Morton Stanley's death. Lifoco was performed before the Governor General, Léo Pétillon in 1955.

At the start of the 1950s a Congolese cine-club was established in Léopoldville, and under Belgian instruction Mongita helped to shoot La Leçon de Cinéma (The Film Lesson) in 1951.  Most of the club's Congolese members did not make films after independence, suggesting that their training had not been thorough, though Mongito did make one documentary in 1963.

Works

Plays
 Mangengenge, published in mimeographed form, 1956
 Soki Stanley, La Quinzaine, 1957
 Ngombe, published serially in Présence Congolaise, 1964

Films
 (with other students) La Leçon de Cinéma [The Film Lesson], 1951
 Les tams-tams du Congo, 1963

References

1916 births
1985 deaths
Democratic Republic of the Congo actors
Democratic Republic of the Congo dramatists and playwrights
Democratic Republic of the Congo film directors
Democratic Republic of the Congo painters